Candelas are a Welsh rock band from Llanuwchllyn, North Wales.

Background
Candelas released their first EP Kim Y Syniad in 2011. Since being signed to the label I Ka Ching in 2013 they have released two albums and three singles. Their first album featured songs in both Welsh and English and their second album is entirely sung in Welsh. In February 2014, the band won three Y Selar awards for best Welsh language song, best long record and best band. They won best Welsh language band again in February 2015, also winning the best artwork prize. Their album Bodoli'n Ddistaw was shortlisted for the 2015 Welsh-language album of the year.

In 2016 the band recorded a cover of Yr Anhrefn's Rhedeg i Paris (Running to Paris in English), described as the "anthem of the Summer", to celebrate the Wales football team reaching the European Football Championship.

The band have played at numerous music festivals across Wales such as Festival Number 6, Maes B, and Tafwyl which they headlined in 2016 and again in 2017 after Bryn Fôn pulled out.

In 2017, the band were reported to be recording their first English-language EP and a third album, which was released in 2018 titled Wyt Ti'n Meiddio Dod i Chwarae following two singles.

The band's drummer, Lewis Williams, won best instrumentalist at the 2013 Y Selar awards for his work in Candelas and Sŵnami.

Discography

Singles

Albums and EPs

References

External links
Candelas BBC Wales Horizons page
Artist page on I Ka Ching Website
BBC Music page

Welsh-language bands
Welsh indie rock groups
Musical groups established in 2009